Chingai is one of the 60 Vidhan Sabha constituencies in the Indian state of Manipur that makes up the Manipur Legislative Assembly. It is named after the village of Chingai in Ukhrul district.

Members of Legislative Assembly 
 1980: Somi A. Shimray, Janata Party
 1984: R. V. Mingthing, Indian National Congress
 1990: Somi A. Shimray, Manipur People's Party
 1995: Dr. Mashangthei Horam, Indian National Congress
 2000: Dr. Khashim Ruivah, Federal Party of Manipur
 2002: A. Aza, Indian National Congress
 2007: Dr. Khashim Ruivah, Independent (politician)
 2012: Mk Peshrow, Indian National Congress

Election results

2017

2012

See also
 List of constituencies of the Manipur Legislative Assembly
 Ukhrul district

References

External link
 

Assembly constituencies of Manipur
Ukhrul district